Adam Korson is a Canadian actor, best known for his lead role as Harry in the Canadian television sitcom Seed.

Early life and education 
Originally from Thornhill, Ontario, Korson attended York University for a year before transferring to Randolph Academy for the Performing Arts.

Career 
Korson garnered a Canadian Screen Award nomination for best lead actor in a comedy series at the 3rd Canadian Screen Awards.

In addition to Seed, Korson has had supporting or guest roles in the television series Degrassi, 2 Broke Girls, The Jon Dore Television Show, Emily Owens M.D., The Glades, Hot in Cleveland and SurrealEstate, and the film Breakfast with Scot.

Filmography

Film

Television

References

External links

Living people
21st-century Canadian male actors
Canadian male film actors
Canadian male stage actors
Canadian male television actors
Male actors from Ontario
People from Thornhill, Ontario
Jewish Canadian male actors
York University alumni
Randolph College for the Performing Arts alumni
Year of birth missing (living people)